The Guyana Amazon Warriors are a women's cricket team that compete in the Women's Caribbean Premier League and The 6ixty, representing Guyana. The formation of the team was announced in March 2022, aligned with the equivalent men's team, playing their first match in August 2022.

The team's first squad was announced in June 2022, with the side captained by Stafanie Taylor.

History
On 14 March 2022, Cricket West Indies announced their intention to hold the first Women's Caribbean Premier League, to run alongside the men's tournament, which began in 2013. Guyana Amazon Warriors were one of three teams announced to be taking part in the tournament, aligned with one of the men's teams. The team's squad was announced on 16 June 2022, with Stafanie Taylor announced as captain of the team. The inaugural Women's Caribbean Premier League is scheduled to begin on 31 August 2022.

On 22 June 2022, it was announced that a T10 tournament would precede the Women's CPL, taking place from 24 to 28 August, known as The 6ixty and involving the three teams competing in the main tournament. The side finished bottom of the group in the inaugural edition of The 6ixty. They also finished bottom of the group in the inaugural Women's Caribbean Premier League.

Players

Current squad
As per 2022 season. Players in bold have international caps.

Seasons

The 6ixty

Women's Caribbean Premier League

See also
 Guyana Amazon Warriors
 Guyana women's national cricket team

References

Cricket in Guyana
Women's Caribbean Premier League teams
Cricket clubs established in 2022